Health Sciences Charter School is a charter high school located in the City of Buffalo, New York. The school opened in 2010 and is located at 1140 Ellicott Street and is located in the East Side of Buffalo, a few blocks north of the Buffalo Niagara Medical Campus. The current principal is Mr. Jaime Venning, and the current assistant principal is Ms. Nichole Walls.

Academics 
Health Sciences Charter School was founded by multiple healthcare organizations (including in response to the growing need of healthcare professionals in the Buffalo area. These organizations provide internships to HSCS students as part of their coursework.

Health Sciences Charter School's partners include:

Blue Cross Blue Shield Association of WNY
Catholic Health System
Communications Workers of America
Erie Community College
Erie County Medical Center
Independent Health Association
Kaleida Health System
Roswell Park Comprehensive Cancer Center
Univera Healthcare

History 
The school was originally housed at 169 Sheridan Parkway Drive in Tonawanda, New York. In 2011, it moved into its current location at 1140 Ellicott Street, constructed in 1898 as St. Vincent's Female Orphan Asylum. The building was used as Bishop O'Hern High School from 1952-1971 and later Erie Community College until 1981.

Health Sciences began as a ninth grade only school, adding one grade per year until all four years of high school were housed. The first graduating class graduated in 2014.

References

External links 
Health Sciences Charter School

Charter schools in New York (state)
Education in Erie County, New York
High schools in New York (state)
Public high schools in New York (state)
Schools in Buffalo, New York
Schools in Erie County, New York